Below is a list of players who have played 50 or more league games for FC Hansa Rostock. For all FC Hansa Rostock players with an article, see :Category:FC Hansa Rostock players.

Players

References 
 Uwe Krüger: Hansa Rostock. Daten - Fakten - Bilder (Ostdeutsche Traditionsvereine, Bd. 2/Agon Statistics 33), Agon, Kassel 1998 
 Robert Rosentreter, Günter Simon: Immer hart am Wind. 40 Jahre F.C. Hansa Rostock. Die Werkstatt, Göttingen 2005,

External links 
 FC Hansa Rostock players on fussballdaten.de (German)
 FC Hansa Rostock players on weltfussball.de (German)
 FC Hansa Rostock players on rsssf.com

Players

Hansa Rostock
Association football player non-biographical articles